Laurie Joseph Boschman (born June 4, 1960) is a Canadian former professional ice hockey centre who played in the National Hockey League (NHL) for 14 seasons for the Toronto Maple Leafs, Edmonton Oilers, Winnipeg Jets, New Jersey Devils and Ottawa Senators. In his final NHL season, Boschman served as the first captain of the Ottawa Senators. Boschman was born in Major, Saskatchewan, but grew up in Kerrobert, Saskatchewan. Boschman is one of only sixteen players in NHL history to have recorded over 500 points and over 2,000 PIM in their career.

Junior hockey
Boschman joined the Brandon Wheat Kings of the Western Canada Hockey League (WCHL) at the end of the 1976-77 season, appearing in three games with the Wheat Kings, earning an assist. In 12 playoff games with Brandon, Boschman had a goal and two points.

In his first full season with the Wheat Kings in 1977-78, Boschman finished fourth in team scoring with 42 goals and 99 points in 72 games, as well as accumulating 227 penalty minutes, helping Brandon have the best record in the league. In the post-season, Boschman had two goals and seven points in six games, as the Wheat Kings were eliminated in the division semi-finals.

Boschman exploded offensively for Brandon in the 1978-79, as he had 66 goals and 149 points in 65 games, finishing only behind linemates Brian Propp and Ray Allison in league scoring, as the Wheat Kings finished the season with a 58-5-9 record, scoring 491 goals. In the post-season, Boschman had 11 goals and 34 points in 22 games, as Brandon defeated the Portland Winter Hawks to win the President's Cup and earn a berth in the 1979 Memorial Cup. In five Memorial Cup games, Boschman had three goals and seven points, as the Wheat Kings lost to the Peterborough Petes in the final game by a 2-1 score in overtime. Boschman was named to the Western Hockey League all-star team and the Memorial Cup all-star team.

Professional career

Toronto Maple Leafs
Boschman was drafted by the Toronto Maple Leafs in the first round, ninth overall, at the 1979 NHL Entry Draft.

He made the Maple Leafs as a 19-year-old, and appeared in all 80 games with the team during the 1979-80 season, scoring 16 goals and 48 points to finish tied for fourth in team scoring. In three playoff games, Boschman had a goal and two points, as the Maple Leafs were swept by the Minnesota North Stars in the opening playoff round.

Boschman saw time with the New Brunswick Hawks of the American Hockey League (AHL) in 1980-81, playing in four games with the team, scoring four goals and five points, as well as 47 penalty minutes. The rest of the 1980-81 season was spent with the Leafs, as Boschman scored 14 goals and 33 points, and 178 penalty minutes in 53 games with Toronto. In three playoff games, Boschman was held off the scoresheet, as the Maple Leafs were swept by the New York Islanders in the first round of the post-season.

He began the 1981-82 season with Toronto, and in 54 games Boschman had nine goals and 28 points. He was publicly ridiculed multiple times and threatened to be sent down to the minors by Leafs owner Harold Ballard, as Ballard did not like that Boschman had become a born again Christian, claiming he became "soft" as a result.

Boschman's time with the Leafs came to an end, as on March 9, 1982, he was traded to the Edmonton Oilers for Walt Poddubny and Phil Drouillard.

Edmonton Oilers
Boschman finished the 1981-82 season with the Edmonton Oilers appearing in 11 games, scoring two goals and five points, as the team won the Smythe Division. In the playoffs, Boschman had an assist in three games, as the Oilers were upset by the Los Angeles Kings in the first round of the post-season.

Boschman struggled during the 1982-83 with the Oilers, scoring eight goals and 20 points in 62 games. On March 7, 1983, Edmonton traded Boschman to the Winnipeg Jets for Willy Lindstrom.

Winnipeg Jets
Boschman appeared in 12 games with the Winnipeg Jets in 1982-83, scoring three goals and eight points, as the team qualified for the playoffs. In three post-season games, Boschman earned an assist in three games, as the Jets were swept by Boschman's former team, the Edmonton Oilers in the Smythe Division semi-finals.

Boschman had a breakout season with the Jets in 1983-84, as he scored 28 goals and 74 points in 61 games, as well as earning a team high 234 penalty minutes. In the post-season, Boschman was held to an assist in three games, as the Jets were swept by the Edmonton Oilers for the second consecutive season.

In 1984-85, Boschman improved on his offensive numbers, scoring 32 goals and 76 points in 80 games, as well as a team high 180 penalty minutes, helping Winnipeg make the playoffs. In the post-season, Boschman had two goals and three points in eight games, as the Jets defeated the Calgary Flames before being swept by the Edmonton Oilers for the third straight season, this time in the Smythe Division final.

Boschman had another productive season with the Jets in 1985-86 season, scoring 27 goals and 69 points in 77 games, and earning a career high 241 penalty minutes. In three playoff games, Boschman was held to assist, as the Jets were swept by the Calgary Flames in the first round.

In 1986-87, Boschman saw his offensive numbers decline, as in 80 games, he scored 17 goals and 41 points, his lowest totals since joining the Jets. In 10 post-season games, Boschman had two goals and five points, as Winnipeg defeated the Calgary Flames in the first round of the playoffs, before being swept by the Edmonton Oilers in the Smythe Division final.

Boschman appeared in all 80 games with the Jets in 1987-88, scoring 25 goals and 48 points, as well as 229 penalty minutes, helping the club reach the post-season once again. In five playoff games, Boschman had a goal and four points, as the Jets lost to the Edmonton Oilers in the first round.

Boschman saw his offense dip in 1988-89, as in 70 games, Boschman scored 10 goals and 36 points, as the team failed to qualify for the playoffs.

His offensive game continued to struggle in 1989-90, as in 66 games, Boschman earned 10 goals and 27 points. On February 16, 1990, Boschman was suspended for eight games after high-sticking Los Angeles Kings forward Tomas Sandstrom. In two playoff games, Boschman was held pointless, as the Jets lost to the Edmonton Oilers in the first round.

On September 6, 1990, the Jets traded Boschman to the New Jersey Devils for Bob Brooke.

New Jersey Devils
Boschman appeared in 78 games in his first season with the New Jersey Devils in 1990-91, scoring 11 goals and 20 points, helping the team qualify for the post-season.  In seven playoff games, Boschman had a goal and two points, as New Jersey lost to the Pittsburgh Penguins in the first round.

In 75 games with the Devils in 1991-92, Boschman scored eight goals and 28 points. In seven playoff games, Boschman had a goal, as the team lost to the New York Rangers in the opening round of the playoffs.

On June 18, 1992, the Ottawa Senators selected Boschman in the 1992 NHL Expansion Draft.

Ottawa Senators
Boschman joined the expansion Ottawa Senators for the 1992-93, and was named as the first captain in team history prior to the season. In 70 games with Ottawa, Boschman had nine goals and 16 points.

After only one season with the Senators, the club bought out Boschman's contract.

Fife Flyers
Boschman briefly played with the Fife Flyers of the British Hockey League in 1994-95, scoring nine goals and 18 points in seven games with the team. In six playoff games, Boschman had five goals and 13 points.

Personal life
Boschman currently lives in Stittsville, Ontario, (a part of Ottawa) with his three sons, Brent, Mark and Jeff. His wife, Nancy, died early in 2006. Boschman is now part of Hockey Ministries International, a ministry that combines ice hockey with Christianity.

Awards
Named to the WHL First All-Star Team (1979)
Named to the Memorial Cup All-Star Team (1979).
Won Molson Cup (Three-Stars Leader) for the Winnipeg Jets (1983–84).

Career statistics

See also
 Captain (ice hockey)
List of NHL players with 1000 games played
List of NHL players with 2000 career penalty minutes

References

External links

Hockey Draft Central
Christian Hockey Players

1960 births
Brandon Travellers players
Brandon Wheat Kings players
Canadian Christians
Canadian ice hockey centres
Canadian people of German descent
Edmonton Oilers players
Fife Flyers players
Ice hockey people from Saskatchewan
Living people
National Hockey League first-round draft picks
New Jersey Devils players
Ottawa Senators players
Toronto Maple Leafs draft picks
Toronto Maple Leafs players
Winnipeg Jets (1979–1996) players
Canadian expatriate ice hockey players in the United States
Canadian expatriate ice hockey players in Scotland